Abdessamad El Mobarky (born 1 January 1981) is a Moroccan professional footballer who plays as a midfielder for Chabab Rif Al Hoceima.

International career
In January 2014, coach Hassan Benabicha invited El Mobarky to be a part of the Morocco squad for the 2014 African Nations Championship. He helped the team to top group B after drawing with Burkina Faso and Zimbabwe and defeating Uganda. The team was eliminated from the competition at the quarter-finals after losing to Nigeria.

References

External links
 
 

1981 births
Living people
Place of birth missing (living people)
Moroccan footballers
Association football midfielders
Chabab Rif Al Hoceima players
Renaissance Club Athletic Zemamra players
Botola players
Morocco international footballers
Morocco A' international footballers
2014 African Nations Championship players
2016 African Nations Championship players